Cabanaquinta (Spanish name: Cabañaquinta, and officially Cabanaquinta / Cabañaquinta) is one of 18 parish (administrative division)  in Aller, a municipality within the province and autonomous community of Asturias, in northern Spain.

Villages
 La Coḷḷá
 El Barriru
 La Bolera
 El Buliru
 La Foyaca
 La Garduña
 El Merendonal
 Parrieḷḷes
 La Pedrera
 La Plaza
 La Polea
 El Recuistru
 Rozá
 La Sierra
 Solasierra
 Sopedraño
 La Vacaína
 La Vaḷḷina

References

Parishes in Aller